Ornithodesmus (meaning "bird link") is a genus of small, dromaeosaurid dinosaur from the Isle of Wight in England, dating to about 125 million years ago. The name was originally assigned to a bird-like sacrum (a series of vertebrae fused to the hip bones), initially believed to come from a bird and subsequently identified as a pterosaur. More complete pterosaur remains were later assigned to Ornithodesmus, until recently a detailed analysis determined that the original specimen in fact came from a small theropod, specifically a dromaeosaur. All pterosaurian material previously assigned to this genus has been renamed Istiodactylus.

Description 
As it is only known from isolated vertebrae, little is known about the appearance of Ornithodesmus. The neural spines of the vertebrae are fused and form a blade over the 9.6 centimetres long sacrum, which is slightly arched. The bases of the neural spines form a lateral platform, and the first two vertebrae of the sequence have deep hollow cavities, which formed space for air sacs.

Dromaeosaur teeth probably belonging to a velociraptorine are known from the same formation, but are too large to have belonged to Ornithodesmus; rather, these must have come from a theropod closer in size to the giant Utahraptor.

History and classification
 
Ornithodesmus cluniculus was first described by Harry Govier Seeley in 1887, based on a set of six fused vertebrae from the hip (sacrum), specimen number BMNH R187, found by William D. Fox in the Wessex Formation of Brook Bay. Seeley thought the bones came from a primitive bird, and gave it a name meaning "bird link", from Greek ὄρνις (ornis), "bird", en δεσμός (desmos), "link". The specific name cluniculus means "little buttock" in Latin, a reference to the small thighs indicated by the size of the specimen.

Later that year, John Hulke (in an anonymous paper) suggested the remains actually belonged to a pterosaur. Seeley himself later changed his opinion when he described the complete skeleton (specimen number BMNH R176) of a new pterosaur species he believed was closely related to O. cluniculus. He named this new species Ornithodesmus latidens in 1901. Although he now considered it a pterosaur, Seeley at the time still considered Ornithodesmus close to the origin of birds, and suggested the (now defunct) theory that birds and pterosaurs shared a close common ancestry. For over a century following this, the pterosaur O. latidens was used as the standard example of Ornithodesmus, and the fragmentary type specimen was largely ignored. In 1913, Reginald Walter Hooley named a new family to distinguish Ornithodesmus from other large pterosaurs known at the time, Ornithodesmidae.

In 1993, Stafford C. Howse and Andrew Milner re-examined the type specimen of O. cluniculus and determined that Seeley had incorrectly referred the pterosaur species to this genus. They identified O. cluniculus as a theropod dinosaur. Specifically, they suggested it was a troodontid, based on its similarity to the supposed troodontid specimen BMNH R4463. However, later study by Peter Makovicky and Mark Norell showed this specimen to be a dromaeosaurid; because of this mis-identification, they suggested Ornithodesmus was likely a dromaeosaurid as well. Darren Naish and colleagues in 2001 argued against a dromaeosaurid identity for Ornithodesmus, suggesting instead it was related to the ceratosaurs or coelophysids. However, those scientists later changed their opinions, publishing a paper in 2007 that agreed with previous studies and classifying Ornithodesmus as a dromaeosaurid. A 2019 analysis placed Ornithodesmus in family Unenlagiidae, otherwise considered a subgroup of Dromaeosauridae.

The more complete pterosaur specimens that had long been associated with the name Ornithodesmus were given a new name in 2001, Istiodactylus.

See also 
 Timeline of dromaeosaurid research

References

External links 
 

Dromaeosaurs
Barremian life
Early Cretaceous dinosaurs of Europe
Cretaceous England
Fossils of England
Fossil taxa described in 1887
Taxa named by Harry Seeley